Mirama Hills is a town in the Western Region of Uganda.

Location
Mirama Hills is located in Ntungamo District, Ankole sub-region. The town is at Uganda's border with Rwanda and lies very close to where the borders of Uganda, Rwanda, and Tanzania intersect. The coordinates of the town are:1°03'03.0"S, 30°27'36.0"E (Latitude:-1.050820; Longitude:30.459990).

Overview
The small town of Mirama Hills, Ntungamo District, in Southwestern Uganda, sits on Uganda's border with the Republic of Rwanda, very close to the three-corners point where the borders of the two countries meet with the border with Tanzania. The town lies on the banks of River Muvumba, a tributary of the Kagera River. Immediately south of Mirama Hills, across the border, in Rwanda, lies the town of Kagitumba. The Mirama Hills - Kagitumba border crossing is one of the two busiest transit points between Uganda and Rwanda; the other being the Katuna - Gatuna border crossing. Between 2011 and 2015, the border crossing underwent upgrades to facilitate a single clearance process involving one joint stop for both countries.

Points of interest
The following points of interest lie within the town limits or close to the edges of the town:
 The offices of Mirama Hills Town Council
 The International Border Crossing between Uganda and the Republic of Rwanda
 The confluence of Muvumba River and Kagera River - This point marks the confluence of the International borders of Rwanda, Tanzania and Uganda.
 Mirama Hills Central Market
 The Ntungamo–Mirama Hills Road - The previously gravel road, was improved to class II bitumen standard with culverts and drainage channels, between October 2014, and September 2017.

See also

References

External links
 Uganda, Rwanda Start 24-Hour Border Services

Populated places in Western Region, Uganda
Ntungamo District
Rwanda–Uganda border crossings